The George O. Bergstrom House is located in Neenah, Wisconsin.

History
The house was owned by prominent businessman and local politician George O. Bergstrom. In addition, his son, George Edwin Bergstrom was raised in the house. The younger Bergstrom would become a noted architect who designed many famous buildings, arguably the most famous being The Pentagon.

The house was added to the State Register of Historic Places in 1992 and to the National Register of Historic Places the following year.

References

Houses on the National Register of Historic Places in Wisconsin
National Register of Historic Places in Winnebago County, Wisconsin
Houses in Winnebago County, Wisconsin
Queen Anne architecture in Wisconsin
Shingle Style architecture in Wisconsin
Limestone buildings in the United States
Houses completed in 1894